Hucko or Hučko is a surname. Notable people with the surname include: 

Erik Hucko (born 1975), Slovak handball player
Ivan Hucko (born 1965), Slovak football manager
Ján Hucko (born 1932), Slovak football player and coach
Ladislav Hučko (born 1948), Slovak prelate, Greek Catholic apostolic Exarch in Czech Republic
Patrik Hučko (born 1973), Czech ice hockey player
Peanuts Hucko (1918–2003), American big band musician
Tomáš Hučko (born 1985), Slovak football player